The Original Hinsons (sometimes referred to as The Singing Hinson Family) were a multi-award-winning Southern Gospel group that was formed in 1967 and was active until 1994.

History 
The Original Hinsons were a prominent southern gospel group.  Consisting of siblings Ronny, Yvonne, Kenny and Larry, they first sang together in 1967 after being asked to sing during revival services at a small church in Freedom, California. Though they had never sung together as a unit, they soon found themselves a popular favorite in churches and concert appearances along the west coast of the United States. Initially, they were known as The Singing Hinson Family.  However, as time and their popularity progressed they became known simply as The Hinsons.  Later, they were known as The Original Hinsons.

Younger brother Larry tells the story behind the Hinsons signature song:  "It was written in 1970, in the downstairs bathroom of a church then called "The Pentecostal Tabernacle." We had been rehearsing songs that Saturday evening and found the necessity to have new material to stage. Ronny disappeared for several minutes, only to return to the church sanctuary brandishing a long fluttering piece of toilet paper. After some collaboration with Kenny the world-famous song "The Lighthouse" was born. It was first recorded the next year by The Goodmans and then by The Hinsons. Songs of Calvary and Journey Music, (then owned by Rusty Goodman), co-published the song. The Lighthouse quickly became a huge hit in southern gospel and remains one of the most recorded songs in all of southern Gospel.  From 1973 till 1979 The Hinsons were the co-hosts of the popular television show "The Gospel Singing Jubilee."  For over a year, the Hinsons maintained at least four songs in the monthly top ten of southern gospel music.   Although the Hinsons were an extremely popular touring group, they were considered radical for their concert style, which was far more ministry oriented than most of the more established professional groups.  Always innovators, the group recorded several albums in the 1980s that changed the face of their industry with an eclectic mix of songs and styles ranging from traditional southern gospel, contemporary Christian, and what would soon become known as Country gospel.

In 1974, Sister Yvonne left the road and was replaced for six years by two time Queen of Gospel Music recipient Chris Hawkins.  In 1980 Chris left the group to start a full-time ministry with her husband Darrell which became The Freemans. Just as Yvonne re-joined the group, Larry left the group in 1981 to travel the country as an evangelist with his wife Jana and two young children until 1986 when he and his wife became pastors of a church in Little Rock AR. He was replaced by their nephew, Eric Hinson. In late 1984, Ronny "Bo" Hinson Jr replaced Eric until 1988, when the group took some time off for the members to pursue their individual ministries.

Kenny continued to sing as well as preach the gospel and soon found himself pastor of a church in Houston TX.  After 4 years, in 1992 he felt the pull of the family singing ministry once again.

After many conversations and phone calls with his family, Larry approached their record producer at Calvary Music Group and suggested a reunion project involving the original members. The original group reunited for the thirteen city "One More Hallelujah" tour. The album "One More Hallelujah" featured the songs "Joy Comes In The Morning”, “I'll Never Be Over The Hill” and “I've Been To Heaven”. During the tour, lead singer Kenny Hinson was diagnosed with kidney cancer.

After Kenny's passing, Ronny, the eldest of the brothers in the group, continued to perform, write, as well as produce. He is a renowned songwriter, having written over 10 #1 songs on the southern gospel charts, and over 100 songs that charted in the top 10.

Yvonne continued to pursue her ministry of singing and healing.  On several occasions, the Original Hinsons reunited for special events, featuring Bo Hinson as lead, and either Yvonne Hinson Johnson or Chris Hawkins Freeman.

Larry continued pastoring until 1996 when he and His wife Jana and young son Matthew went out on the evangelistic field. For the next 12 years, they ministered all across America. In 2008 they felt the call of God to start SouthPoint Church in White House, TN. Dr. Larry Hinson passed on April 22, 2020.

Awards and honors
The Hinsons were recognized by both the Dove Award and the Singing News Fan Awards (SNFA) for the 1972 Song of the year, "The Lighthouse".  In 1973, they again won the SNFA Song of the Year for "He Pilots My Ship."  In 1979, they were the SNFA choice for favorite group.  Chris Hawkins was chosen as the SNFA favorite female singer in both 1976 and 1977.  Larry was voted SNFA Favorite Baritone in 1977.  Kenny was Favorite Male Singer for 1976, 1978 and 1980.  In 1994, Kenny won a Diamond Award for his song "I'll Never Be Over the Hill" at the National Quartet Convention.

Ronny won the Favorite Songwriter award for four consecutive years from 1988 to 1991.

In 2000, Kenny was voted "Artist of the Decade" and placed into the Millennium Hall of Fame by ICGMA (International Country Gospel Music Association.)  Kenny was inducted into the Gospel Music Association's Hall of Fame in 2004. The entire group was inducted into the Gospel Music Association's Hall of Fame in 2006.

Personnel changes 
In 1974, Yvonne left the road and was replaced for six years by two time Queen of Gospel Music recipient Chris Hawkins Freeman. In 1981 Just as Yvonne re-joined the group, Larry, left the group and was replaced by their nephew, Eric Hinson. In late 1984. Ronny "Bo" Hinson Jr. replaced Eric until 1988. when the group took some time off for the members to pursue individual ministries. In 1992, Ronny, Larry, Kenny, and Yvonne reunited for the "One More Hallelujah" tour.  After Kenny's passing, the Original Hinsons have reunited only for special events, with Bo singing lead, and either with Chris Hawkins Freeman or their sister Yvonne Hinson Johnson.

The Hinsons 
In 1990 Bo Hinson started a group called Bo Hinson and Purpose.  This evolved into The New Hinsons.  The group experienced success in 1994 with the release of the hit song, "Speak the Word, Lord". And in 1996, the group had their first #1 song with the hit "Oasis." The song was written by Ronny Hinson. "Oasis" was #1 for 4 months (April–July 1996) and came in as the #1 song for all of 1996. On Paul Heil's program, "The Gospel Greats", the song was named the #6 song in the Top 20 Songs of the 1990s. Also featured in the baritone part was Mike Bowling, who would later travel with the Perrys and Crabb Family and eventually start his own group in 2006. The group later claimed the #1 spot again in December 1996 with "Old Ship of Zion". The New Hinsons would continue to experience success with hits like "If There Had Been No Calvary", "Sin Died Here", "Still Go Free", and "Who but God?". With the family's blessing, in 2008 Bo renamed The New Hinsons to The Hinsons. Their first recording under that name was entitled, "Favor". This album features the songs The Potter's Wheel, Holy Awe, and God Will Make A Way.

The Hinson Family 
In 2008 Weston Hinson (son of Kenny Hinson) started the group Weston Hinson & By Faith and in 2009 they recorded their debut album Home With You Tonight. featuring songs as "Healed Perfect" and  "Let Go Of The Rope". Later they changed the name to Weston and Christy Hinson and recorded their 2nd album called Let's Have Some Church, with songs as "Let's Have Some Church", "I Get To Go", "On The Other Side Of This", as well as the world-famous song "The Lighthouse", which featured Larry Hinson. In 2013, they were joined by Jordyn Honea. Later that year, they recorded their 3rd album Christmas Like It Was. In 2014, they changed the name to The Hinson Family then recorded their 4th album Tribute To The Original Hinsons with such songs as "Burdens are Lifted Away", "Joy Comes in The Morning", "Never Be Over The Hill", and the world-famous "Call Me Gone", among many more.

Members

Weston Hinson
Christy Hinson
Jordan Honea

From California to New York, and everywhere in between, the reaction at each concert has been a resounding echo lauding the unique sound for which The Hinson Family has become known.  For those already familiar with the world of Christian and Gospel music, a common phrase used to describe their sound usually comes across something like, "They sound so much like the Original Hinsons, but they have created a sound that is all their own and I can’t get enough."  Still, there are those along the way in churches or concert venues that have yet become acquainted with the inspirational themed music of the church and often their reaction comes with a smile from ear to ear as though they had found a prize in an unexpected place and they say things like, "I never thought I would like Christian or Gospel music until I heard The Hinson Family.  Their music belongs on the radio today and everyone needs to hear it."

As their success continues to build and they are sharing the stage with a variety of hugely popular artists from different genres of gospel, they are gaining the accolades of their musical peers as well:

Jason Crabb (Grammy Award Winning Gospel Artist) – "Love their sound. Great voices and great music. More than all of that they have the heart for Gods people. You will be blessed anytime you get a chance to see them. God has truly left his touch on their lives. Glad to call them my friends!"

Rebecca Lynn Howard (Award-Winning Country Music Artist) – "Hearing The Hinson Family sing is a flood to my soul! The anointing their voices carry is uncontainable! Weston is a true 'Chip off the ol’ block., as you are shaken by the familiar tones and vocal moves of his voice, it's apparent that his late father, Kenny Hinson, has passed the mantle on to him. Weston's wife Christy brings a fresh anointing of her own as her incredible range pierces the heart of all who are listening. Their blend is superb. Their song choices are always on point and their delivery is Holy Ghost inspired!"

Bruce Minchey (Major Promoter in Dallas/Ft Worth Area) – “It is a pleasure to work with The Hinson Family!  They do an excellent job continuing the music of The Original Hinsons mixed with their own original songs.  As a promoter, I appreciate their professionalism and creativity in helping promote their concerts.  I highly recommend The Hinson Family!”

By 2013, The Hinson Family had grown from being a Husband and Wife duo to a Family Trio as their 16-year-old daughter Jordan, joined in April of that year.  Jordy, as she is lovingly called by those close to her, has won many fans with her smooth vocal style that many have likened to Country Music legend Connie Smith with a touch of bluegrass.  At the tender age of 17 Jordy wrote her first song entitled, “You’re Forgiven.”  This song has been slated to be recorded on the next recording to be produced.  With a premium value put on songwriting and originality this group looks to have staying power and potential for songs to do more than just top the charts.  In 2014, The Hinson Family (Then Called “Weston & Christy Hinson) was honored with several nominations for Diamond Awards.  Those nominations include a top 5 for favorite recording “Let’s Have Some Church,” Weston was nominated in the top 5 for “Male Vocalist of the Year” along with Jason Crabb, Jeff Easter, and others.  Christy was also nominated for “Songwriter of the Year” for her contribution of 6 original songs on “Let’s Have Some Church.”

In 2016 and beyond, The Hinson Family are looking to make a bigger splash on a bigger scene.  When asked about the group's comparisons to his family The Original Hinsons, Weston had this to say, “We aren’t trying to be the Original Hinsons or any other group that has inspired us…what we’re trying to do is take what we’ve learned from those phenomenal artists and build something even bigger.  That’s the purpose of a foundation…to build on it, and that’s how we view our heritage…as a cornerstone from which we can build on their successes and learn from their hard work and determination.”  This group feels that there isn't anything that they cannot accomplish both musically and professionally.  In one word, what best describes the future for The Hinson Family is...”BOUNDLESS!”

Members 
Lead
Kenny Hinson(1967–1994)

Alto/High Tenor/Soprano
Yvonne Hinson Johnson(1967–1974) (1980–1994)
Chris Hawkins Freeman(1974–1980)

Bass
Ronny Hinson(1967–1994)

Tenor/Baritone/Lead
Larry Hinson (1967–1981) (1992–1994)
Eric Hinson (1981–1984)
Bo Hinson (1984–1988)

Discography

The Original Hinsons
Here Comes The Hinsons (1970)
A Gospel Sound Spectacular (1970)
The Lighthouse (1971) featuring the GMA Song of the Year for 1972
He Pilots My Ship (1972) featuring the SNFA Song of the Year for 1973
We Promise You Gospel (1973)

With Chris Hawkins
Touch Of Hinson, Glimpse Of Glory (1974)
Harvest Of Hits (1975)
High Voltage (1976)
From Out Of The West They Came, Live and On Stage (1975)
The Group That God Built (1977)
On The Road (1978)
Prime (1979)

With Larry and Yvonne
Song Vineyard (1980)

With Eric Hinson
Bubblin' (1981)
Hinsongs (1982)
To The Core (1983)
A Hinson Christmas (1983)
Lift The Roof Off, Live (1984)
The Hinsons Greatest Hits Vol. 1 (1986)

With Bo Hinson
It Runs In The Family (1985)
The Legacy Goes On (1986)
Generations (1987)
Encore, Live from Nashville (1988)

With Original Group
One More Hallelujah (1992)
Tulsa Live (1993)

Today 

Ronny continues to perform, preach and sing alongside his wife Lisa. as well as write and produce. He is a renowned and award-winning songwriter, having written over 10 #1 songs on the southern gospel charts, and over 100 songs that charted in the top 10.

Chris Hawkins Freeman still travels with the world-famous and award-winning group The Freemans..

Larry Hinson passed away on April 22nd 2020.

Bo still travels all over the country with his group The Hinsons  giving unique performances wherever they go.

References 

Family musical groups
American gospel musical groups
Musical groups established in 1967
Southern gospel performers
Gospel quartets
Vocal quartets